A domestic JAT Yugoslav Airlines flight, carried out by a Sud Aviation SE-210 Caravelle 6-N (Registration: YU-AHD), was nearing its end completing a scheduled domestic Flight JU 769 from Skopje, SR Macedonia to Titograd (today's Podgorica), SR Montenegro when it crashed into Maganik mountain killing all 41 passengers and crew, along with the aircraft being written off.

Accident
The flight, a scheduled domestic Flight JU 769 from Skopje to Titograd, was nearing its end. Allegedly, the flight was instructed to start descent, although the aircraft was not visible on radar (which were allegedly not working well at the time) nor could the control tower staff make visual contact with the aircraft. At the time of the flight, there were no qualified staff at the control tower in Titograd. The aircraft crashed into the peak of Babin zub on Maganik mountain near Kolašin. All 41 people on board died in the accident.

See also

 List of accidents and incidents involving airliners by airline

Sources
 Dnevnik Online
 View of Babin zub (Grandmother's tooth) peak
 Maganik mountain
 Memorial plate of JAT's aeroplane crash in 1973

References

Jat Airways accidents and incidents
1973 in Yugoslavia
Aviation accidents and incidents in 1973
Transport disasters in Montenegro
Airliner accidents and incidents involving controlled flight into terrain
Accidents and incidents involving the Sud Aviation Caravelle
September 1973 events in Europe